Dinalungan, officially the Municipality of Dinalungan (Tagalog/Kasiguranin: Bayan ng Dinalungan), is a 4th class municipality in the province of Aurora, Philippines. According to the 2020 census, it has a population of 12,508 people.

Two protected areas, the Talaytay Protected Landscape and the Simbahan-Talagas Protected Landscape, are located in the municipality.

Geography
According to the Philippine Statistics Authority, the municipality has a land area of  constituting  of the  total area of Aurora.

Barangays
Dinalungan is politically subdivided into 9 barangays.

Climate

Demographics

In the 2020 census, Dinalungan had a population of 12,508.

Economy

References

External links

[ Philippine Standard Geographic Code]
Dinalungan on Aurora.ph

Municipalities of Aurora (province)